Tis Agapis Maheria (Love's piercing) (Greek: Της Αγάπης Μαχαιριά) is a dramatic television series by Stratos Markidis and a screenplay Yvonne Metaxaki raised by ANT1. The series takes place in Crete and narrates the vendetta between two families, Stamatakides and Leventogiannides. It first aired on January 16, 2006, the series had two seasons.  The first season of 21 episodes and the second season of 42 episodes.

Plot
Two families separated by deep hatred... A feud that rose a century ago. A vendetta that has lasted a century. Now, an unlawful daughter born twenty years ago from a forbidden love, returns in the midst of the incessant quarrel that has spilled much family blood on both sides. The news fall like a bomb in the village.

Cast

In guest roles

Leventogiannis Family

Stamatakis Family

International release

ANT1 original programming
2006 Greek television series debuts
2007 Greek television series endings
Greek-language television shows
Greek drama television series